Jean Wagner (born 3 December 1969) is a retired Luxembourgian football defender.

References

1969 births
Living people
Luxembourgian footballers
Jeunesse Esch players
FC Differdange 03 players
Association football defenders
Luxembourg international footballers